John O'Toole (born ) is a retired politician in Ontario, Canada. He was a member of the Legislative Assembly of Ontario from 1995 to 2014, representing the riding of Durham for the Progressive Conservative Party.

Background
O'Toole is the son of Ruth Annabel (Driscoll) and Claire Michael O'Toole. His ancestors arrived in Canada in 1845, fleeing the Great Famine of Ireland. He was born in Peterborough, Ontario, and has a Bachelor of Arts degree from the University of Toronto. After graduation he worked in upper management for General Motors of Canada in Ontario and Quebec. With his English-born late wife, Molly (Hall), his son is politician Erin O'Toole, former leader of the Conservative Party, who was elected to the House of Commons of Canada in a by-election on November 26, 2012, to represent the federal riding of Durham.

Politics
O'Toole was elected as a school trustee in the Peterborough-Victoria-Northumberland district in 1982, and in the Newcastle district in 1988. In 1991, O'Toole was elected as a municipal councillor in Bowmanville, Ontario, and in 1994, he was elected as councillor for Durham Region.

O'Toole scored a significant victory over incumbent New Democrat Gord Mills in the provincial election of 1995, scoring 62 per cent of the popular vote. He was re-elected in the 1999 election, again without difficulty. He was appointed as parliamentary assistant to several ministers including Consumer and Commercial Relations, Finance, and Health and Long-Term Care.

The Progressive Conservatives were defeated in the 2003 provincial election, although O'Toole managed to retain his own riding. In 2004, O'Toole endorsed John Tory's successful bid to lead the Progressive Conservative party (even though his riding is adjacent to that of Tory's main rival, Jim Flaherty).

In February 2014, O'Toole announced that he would not run for re-election.

In September 2014, O'Toole announced his intentions to run for mayor of Clarington in the 2014 municipal election. He officially filed his papers just before the deadline on September 2, 2014. On October 27, he was defeated by incumbent mayor Adrian Foster by 1,362 votes.

Middle-finger incident
On May 12, 2003, O'Toole was caught on camera in the Ontario Legislature making a middle-finger gesture at NDP House Leader Peter Kormos. He initially denied what he did to media, only to apologize minutes later after he learned it was caught on the legislature video broadcast feed.

Electoral record

References

External links

1944 births
Canadian people of Irish descent
Living people
Ontario municipal councillors
People from Clarington
People from Peterborough, Ontario
Progressive Conservative Party of Ontario MPPs
University of Toronto alumni
21st-century Canadian politicians